The 2020–21 Amateur National Championship is the 2020–21 season for Tier 3, Tier 4 and Tier 5 divisions of the Moroccan football league. Those championships are managed by the LNFA "Ligue nationale du football amateur".

Division National

Clubs 

Source=

League table

Results

Division I

Division I North Group

Clubs 

Amal Belksiri
Hassania Benslimane
Étoile de Casablanca
Fath Casablanca
Wafa Sportif Driouch
Wafaa Fez
ASO Formation Professionnelle
Difâa Hamrya de Khénifra
Renaissance Martil
Fath Wislan Meknes
Mouloudia Missour
Hassania Lazari Oujda
FUS Rabat U23
Union Salé
Wydad Sefrou
Nasma Sportif Settat

League table

Results

Division I South Group

Clubs 

Union Aït Melloul
Najah Souss Agadir
Rajaa Agadir
Mouloudia Assa
Nojom Awsred
AJS Boujdour
Chabab Houara
Club Municipal Laayoune
Mouloudia Laayoune
Ittifaq Marrakech
Mouloudia de Marrakech
Olympique Marrakech
Olympique Phosboucraa
Amal Souk Sebt
Adrar Souss
Mouloudia Tarfaya

League table

Results

Division II

Division II North East Group

Clubs 

Amal Aroui
Club Sportif Azrou
Tihad Chaouen
Chabab Kawakeb Fes
Club Sportif Fnideq
Hassania Guercif
Club Riyadi Ifran
Club de Kasr Lakbir
Chabab Larache
Chabab Seloun
Amal Sidi Hrazem
Ajax Tanger
Union Sportif Taounat
Qods Taza
Club Toulal
Renaissance Zaio

League table

Results

Division II North West Group

Clubs 

FC Casablanca
SCC Roches Noires Casablanca
Wafaa Wydad Casablanca
Raja Casablanca U23
FAR U23
MAS Fez U23
Renaissance El Gara
Chabab Hassani
USD Meknes
AWF Oulad Ziane
Association Shabab Almostoqbal
Youssoufia Rabat
Renaissance Settat
US Sidi Maarouf
Amal Sidi Rahal
Union Yacoub el Mansour

League table

Results

Division II South Group

Clubs 

Najm Anza
Union Azilal
US Bejaâd
Raja Ben Guerir
Ittihad Fkih Ben Salah
Fath Inezgane
DHJ U23
Mouloudia Jorf
Kasbat Mzar
Wifak Safi
Fath Sidi Bennour
CS Sidi Smail
CS Kasbah Tamlalt
Union Taroudant
Chabab Tata
US Amal Tiznit

League table 

<noinclude>

Results

Division II Sahara Group

Clubs 
Chabab Akhfennir
Club el Argoub Dakhla
Union Assa Zag
CF Foum el Oued
Jawhara Guelmim
Majd Laayoune
Rachad Laayoune
Moustaqbal el Marsa
Mouloudia Naïla
Club Municipal El Ouatia
Chabab Saguia el-Hamra
Hawzat Smara
Nahdat Tan-Tan
Najma Tarfaya

League table

Results

See also
 2020–21 Botola
 2020–21 Botola 2

External links
 Morocco Ligue Nationale Du Football Amateur 2020/2021
 Moroccan Amateur Second League 2020/2021

References

2020–21 in Moroccan football
2020–21 in African association football leagues